Apipoo Suntornpanavej (born 18 July 1986), simply known as Bas, is a Thai professional footballer who plays as an attacking midfielder.

Club career

Suntornpanavej played for Osotsapa in the 2007 AFC Champions League group stages, scoring four goals.

International career

He played for the Thailand national under-23 football team at the Southeast Asian Games 2007 and 2009. He also represented Thailand's full national team in 2014 World Cup qualifying, playing 35 minutes in Thailand's group-stage match against Saudi Arabia.
He scored a header against Myanmar in the 2012 AFF Suzuki Cup.

International goals

Scores and results list Thailand's goal tally first.

Honours

International
Thailand U-23
 Sea Games  Gold Medal (1): 2007

References

External links
Apipoo Suntornpanavech profile at PTT Rayong website

1986 births
Living people
Apipoo Suntornpanavej
Apipoo Suntornpanavej
Association football midfielders
Apipoo Suntornpanavej
Apipoo Suntornpanavej
Apipoo Suntornpanavej
Apipoo Suntornpanavej
Apipoo Suntornpanavej
Apipoo Suntornpanavej
Apipoo Suntornpanavej
Southeast Asian Games medalists in football
Apipoo Suntornpanavej
Competitors at the 2007 Southeast Asian Games